Nikola Stajić (born 8 September 2001) is a Serbian professional footballer who plays as a centre-back for Greek Super League club Panetolikos.

References

2001 births
Living people
Serbian footballers
Super League Greece players
Panetolikos F.C. players
Association football defenders